Kulovits is a surname. Notable people with the surname include:

Enrico Kulovits (born 1974), Austrian footballer and manager
Stefan Kulovits (born 1983), Austrian footballer